Məlikumudlu is a village and municipality in the Zardab Rayon of Azerbaijan. It has a population of 1,295.

References

Populated places in Zardab District